Spielberg's After Dark is an upcoming American horror series written and created by Steven Spielberg. The series was set to premiere on the short-form mobile video platform Quibi and would have been only available to watch after sunset. The series will premiere on The Roku Channel following Quibi's shutdown.

Production
On June 9, 2019, Quibi founder Jeffrey Katzenberg announced in a press conference at the Banff World Media Festival that Steven Spielberg was writing a horror series for Katzenberg's then-upcoming service. Spielberg requested that the program only be available to watch after sunset. This will be Spielberg's first writing project since A.I. Artificial Intelligence in 2001.

Release
In October 2020, it was announced that Quibi was shutting down on December 1, 2020, leaving the fate of the series in question.

On January 8, 2021, it was announced that the series will premiere on The Roku Channel.

References

External links
 

American horror fiction television series
English-language television shows
Upcoming television series
Television series by Amblin Entertainment
Works by Steven Spielberg
Horror fiction web series
Roku original programming